Weil, Gotshal & Manges LLP is an American international law firm with approximately 1,100 attorneys, headquartered in New York City. With a gross annual revenue in excess of $1.8 billion, it is among the world's largest law firms according to The American Lawyer's AmLaw 100 survey. It is considered to be one of the most prestigious law firms in the world.

Overview 

The firm was founded in New York City in 1931 by Frank Weil, Sylvan Gotshal, and Horace Manges. Since 1968, Weil has been headquartered in the General Motors building, overlooking Central Park, in New York City's Manhattan borough.
 
After its founding in 1931, the firm grew steadily in the following decades, taking on clients including General Electric and General Motors, and becoming one of the largest law firms in the country. In 1975, the firm opened an office in Washington, D.C., its first outside New York City, followed in the 1980s by locations in Miami, Houston and Dallas. In 1991, the year that the internet became publicly available, Weil was the first global, non-California law firm to open a Silicon Valley office, in Redwood Shores, California. Later, the firm further spread its practice, notably in non-contentious finance and private equity practice.

The fall of the Berlin Wall in 1989 and the subsequent move by Central and Eastern European countries toward market-based economies prompted the firm to launch its international expansion. It established offices in Budapest, Prague and Warsaw in the early 1990s, followed by the establishment of offices in Frankfurt, London, Munich and Paris. In the 21st century, the firm established offices in Beijing, Dubai, Hong Kong, and Shanghai.  one-quarter of the firm's lawyers practiced outside the U.S.

Notable cases

 Olympus Corporation's, Olympus scandal deal for British medical-equipment maker Gyrus earned Weil an undisclosed portion of the extraordinary $687 million fee; the $2 billion acquisition was the largest in Olympus's history; the fee was shared with the deal's financial advisor and its broker. The auditor KPMG refused to issue an unqualified audit report due to issues with the Gyrus deal, for which a 21-attorney Weil team was legal advisor
 General Electric's $11.6 billion sale of GE Plastics to Saudi Basic Industries
 DirecTV's $25 billion stock-for-stock merger with Liberty Entertainment
 Sanofi Aventis's $18 billion acquisition of Genzyme
 General Electric's $35 billion joint venture with Comcast for ownership of NBC Universal
 Apple Inc.'s favorable settlement of litigation with Burst.com
 Sears Holdings 2018 Restructuring Plan 
 CBS Corporation's successful defense against a lawsuit filed by former reporter and news anchorman Dan Rather
 ExxonMobil's successful breach of contract suit against Saudi Basic Industries resulting in a $400 million jury award, one of the largest in history
 eBay's successful defense in trademark litigation with Tiffany & Co.
 Enron bankruptcy
 Lehman Brothers bankruptcy
 Washington Mutual bankruptcy
 WorldCom bankruptcy
 General Motors bankruptcy
 DirecTV's $49 billion sale to AT&T
 Lenovo's $2.9 billion acquisition of Motorola from Google
 Verizon's $4.4 billion acquisition of AOL
 Intel's $16 billion acquisition of Altera
 Facebook's $19 billion acquisition of WhatsApp
 Oracle's $9 billion acquisition of NetSuite

Notable alumni 

 Richard Ben-Veniste, member of the 9/11 Commission
 Geoff Berman, executive director of the New York State Democratic Committee
 Adam Bodnar, former Polish Ombudsman for Citizen Rights
 Jason Boyarski, music industry lawyer
 Vernon S. Broderick, judge of the United States District Court for the Southern District of New York
 Robert B. Charles, Assistant Secretary of State for International Narcotics and Law Enforcement Affairs
 Greg Coleman, first Solicitor General of Texas
 Gregg Costa, judge on the United States Court of Appeals for the Fifth Circuit
 Christopher Nixon Cox, grandson of Richard Nixon
 Mekka Don, rapper
 Barry Eisler, novelist, creator of John Rain novels
 Michael Francies, managing partner of the firm's London office
 Jill M. Friedman, who represented Guantanamo Bay detention camp prisoners, author of The Saudi Repatriates Report
 Martin D. Ginsburg, lawyer, husband of Ruth Bader Ginsburg
 Sylvan Gotshal, founding partner
 Lawrence Otis Graham, best-selling author
 Caitlin Halligan, former Solicitor General of New York
 George J. Hazel, judge of the United States District Court for the District of Maryland
 Melinda Katz, Queens County District Attorney
 Jeffrey L. Kessler, noted sports industry lawyer
 Horace Manges, founding partner
 Harvey R. Miller, Vice Chairman of Greenhill & Co.
 Ira Millstein, current partner at the firm, longest-practicing partner in big law
 Tamika Montgomery-Reeves, associate justice of the Delaware Supreme Court
 Raymond Nimmer, former dean of the University of Houston Law Center
 Robert Odle, Assistant Secretary in the United States Department of Energy under Ronald Reagan
 Harriet Pilpel, women's rights activist
 John A. E. Pottow, professor at the University of Michigan Law School
 Rob Simmelkjaer, television journalist and executive
 Stanley Sporkin, senior judge on the United States District Court for the District of Columbia
 Robert R. Summerhays, judge of the United States District Court for the Western District of Louisiana
 Theodore Tannenwald Jr., judge of the United States Tax Court
 Heath Tarbert, former Chairman of the Commodity Futures Trading Commission
 Suzanne Israel Tufts, Assistant Secretary in the United States Department of Housing and Urban Development
 Frank Weil, founding partner

See also

 List of largest United States-based law firms by profits per partner
 List of companies based in New York City

References

External links
 
 
 Chambers and Partners firm profile 

1931 establishments in New York City
Companies based in Manhattan
Foreign law firms with offices in Hong Kong
Law firms based in New York City
Law firms established in 1931
Partnerships